S.K. Azim  is an Indian professional footballer who plays as a defender for United S.C. in the I-League.

Career

Early career
Azil started his career playing for the West Bengal football team in the Santosh Trophy before joining Mohun Bagan in 2009. He then went on to play for Mohammedan in the Calcutta Football League. Then, in 2010, while playing for West Bengal, Azim helped the side win the Santosh Trophy.

United
Before the 2013–14 Indian Federation Cup, Azim joined I-League side United and he made his debut for the side on 14 January 2014 against Churchill Brothers. He played the full match for United as his side lost 2–1.

References

External links 
 Goal.com Profile.

Living people

Indian footballers
Mohun Bagan AC players
Mohammedan SC (Kolkata) players
United SC players
Association football defenders
Footballers from West Bengal

Year of birth missing (living people)